Burlington GO Station is a railway station and bus station in the GO Transit network, located at 2101 Fairview Street in Burlington, Ontario, Canada, just south of Queen Elizabeth Way between Guelph Line and Brant Street.

Overview 
It is a stop on the Lakeshore West line train service, and was, for a time, the western terminus of the rail services.

There are extensive parking facilities on both the north and south of the station. A large multi-level parking structure opened in 2008, significantly expanding the parking capacity of the station. During weekdays, Burlington Transit serves the south side of the station, connected by wheelchair accessible tunnels under the tracks.

History
The original Great Western Railway station was built in 1855, just west of Brant Street, about half a mile west of the current GO Station. With the building of the Hamilton & Northwestern Railway in 1877, this location became a connection known as Burlington Junction. Coords:

The Grand Trunk Railway (GTR) purchased the Great Western Railway in 1882 and the Hamilton & Northwestern Railway/Northern Railway in 1888, and in turn was absorbed into the Canadian National Railway in 1923

That first station building burnt down in 1904 and was rebuilt in 1906.

GO Transit rush hour service was launched in 1967 and the new station location opened in 1980, with the old station renamed Burlington West. Via Rail service, which followed to the GO Station in 1988, was discontinued in 1990. All day GO Transit service commenced in 1992.

The City of Burlington acquired the 1906 historic station building in 2005. Renamed Freeman Station it had to be moved off site to allow for track improvements and with the purpose of having it restored.

Construction of a new  station building began in September 2012, and was completed in Fall 2017.

Transit connections
Burlington Transit routes:
1 Plains (board at Fairview Street-outside of station)
2 Brant
6 Headon
10 New–Maple
12 Upper Middle
50 Burlington South (Late Night Service only)
51 Burlington Northeast (Late Night Service only)
52 Burlington Northwest (Late Night Service only)
80 Harvester
81 North Service (peak service only)
87 North Service–Aldershot (peak service only)
101 Plains Express (peak service only)

GO Transit bus routes:
12 Niagara Falls
18 Lakeshore West

References

External links

GO Transit railway stations
Railway stations in Burlington, Ontario
Railway stations in Canada opened in 1980
1980 establishments in Ontario